Mordellistena tetraspilota is a species of beetle in the genus Mordellistena of the family Mordellidae. It was described by Burne in 1989.

References

External links
Coleoptera. BugGuide.

Beetles described in 1989
tetraspilota